"Paradise Island Lost" is the name of a two-part story arc written by Phil Jimenez who also did the artwork, featured in Wonder Woman (Vol. 2) #168-169. This was Jimenez' second story arc under his run on Wonder Woman, with the first being the "Gods of Gotham" four-issue story arc from Wonder Woman (Vol. 2) #164-167. Just like "Gods of Gotham" where he was a co-writer with J. M. DeMatteis, he co-wrote this story arc with George Pérez, best known to have rebooted Wonder Woman in 1987 first with the "Gods and Mortals" story arc, that marked his return to the book since 1992. It would not be until issue #171 that Jimenez became the book's sole writer. The story's name is taken from an epic poem of the same name by John Milton.

Plot
While the feud between Princess Diana and Queen Hippolyta continues, because of Diana's role as Wonder Woman and not Queen of Themyscira, another feud arises between the Themysciran Amazons and their Bana-Mighdall Amazon sisters. It is not long until the feud leads to a civil war on Paradise Island between the two tribes breaking out. The war comes to a head as Magala from Bana-Mighdall, the architect of the conflict, is revealed to be none other than Ariadne, in her plot for revenge against the Amazons. With the help of Fury, Ariadne is defeated, and mother and daughter stop the war between the two above the skies with the promise of starting change. They start by shocking everyone with the abolition of the Themysciran Royal Family as both Hippolyta and Diana lay down their titles as Queen and Princess, thus resolving the differences that have long festered between the Amazons of Paradise Island and the Bana-Mighdalls. But even after all that, Hippolyta continues to fight alongside the Justice Society of America as their own Wonder Woman.

Aftermath
The ramifications of this two-parter would continue up to issue #177. During that time, there was a bit of mother/daughter feuding between Diana and Queen Hippolyta, mainly due to Hippolyta being a Wonder Woman (aka the Golden Age Wonder Woman, as she had battles during World War II). The feud is left unresolved when DC's crossover of 2001, "Our Worlds at War", led to Hippolyta being killed off in issue #172, before the two could reconcile. In issue #173, Diana returns to her Amazon sisters to help them before they are destroyed. Later on, in issue #177, Themyscira is rebuilt as, at that time, floating islands. When Diana becomes their princess and ambassador again, she meets her mother once more in the afterlife, and the two are given closure. Eventually, in the crossover Amazons Attack!, Hippolyta returns from the grave.

External links
Wonder Woman: Paradise Lost, collecting both the "Gods of Gotham" story and the two-parter from DC Comics

See also

Comics by George Pérez